At Home with Owen is the fourth studio album by American musician Mike Kinsella under the name Owen, released on November 7, 2006 through Polyvinyl Records.

Release
At Home with Owen was released on November 7, 2006, on Polyvinyl Records. In November and December, Owen went on a US tour alongside Copeland, The Appleseed Cast and Acute. The music video for "One of These Days" premiered through Polyvinyl's vodcast on December 6, 2006. In January 2007, Kinsella toured Japan with Make Believe; in March and April 2007, he went on a US tour with Rocky Votolato and Drag the River. In October 2007, Owen went on a US tour with Kevin Devine and Andy Hull. They ended the year with a short, three-date East Coast tour in December 2007.

Track listing

Personnel
Mike Kinsella - guitar, vocals

Guest musicians
Kristina Dutton - violin
Andy Rader - upright bass
Jamie Burns - vocals
Gillian Lisee - vocals

Trivia
"Femme Fatale" is a cover of The Velvet Underground song with the same name from the album The Velvet Underground & Nico.
"Stolen Bike" is a cover of the Bruce Springsteen song "Stolen Car" from the album "The River".
"Pietro Crespi" from the song "The Sad Waltzes of Pietro Crespi" is a reference to Mike's car, named after the character from the novel One Hundred Years of Solitude by Colombian novelist Gabriel García Márquez.

References

External links
Owen's Webpage
Owen's Myspace
Interview with Mike Kinsella about At Home With Owen from herohill.com

2006 albums
Owen (musician) albums
Polyvinyl Record Co. albums